Wael Abou Faour (born 1974) is a Lebanese politician who served as the Minister of Health.

Early life
Faour was born in 1974 into a Lebanese Druze family. He is a graduate of the American University of Beirut where he received a bachelor's degree in Business Administration. Abou Faour is married to Zeina Hamedeh and has two daughters Sara And Leen. And two boy twins Adham and Walid.

Career
Faour is a senior member of the Progressive Socialist Party and one of the close aides of party's leader Walid Jumblatt. He was first elected deputy in 2005 as part of the Democratic Gathering bloc representing the Western Bekaa, Rashaya. He served at the following parliamentary committees: agriculture and tourism, youth and sports and information technology. On 11 July 2008, he was appointed state minister in the cabinet led by Prime Minister Fouad Siniora. Faour was appointed minister of social affairs in the cabinet headed by Prime Minister Najib Mikati in July 2011.

Wael Abou Faour revealed during a press conference on 11 November 2014 that many popular restaurants and food chains across Lebanon have been violating food safety rules, which brought about the start of a food safety campaign.

References

External links

1972 births
Living people
American University of Beirut alumni
Lebanese Druze
Lebanese socialists
Progressive Socialist Party politicians
Members of the Parliament of Lebanon
Health ministers of Lebanon